Collett may refer to:

 Collett (name), a list of people with the surname or given name
 Collett family
 Collett baronets, a title in the Baronetage of the United Kingdom
 , a US Navy destroyer
 Collett, Indiana, an unincorporated town in the United States
 Collett Park, a public park in Terre Haute, Indiana, on the National Register of Historic Places
 The Collett School, a 4–16 mixed community special school in Hemel Hempstead, Hertfordshire, England

See also
Collett's Snake, a venomous snake native to Australia
Collette (disambiguation)
Colette (disambiguation)
Collet, a holding device in machining